Omodiagbe is a surname. 
Omodiagbe is an Esan Surname which is a combination of three different words in the Esan dialect (language).
The three words are:
“ Omo” - meaning “child”
“ dia” - meaning “to straighten”
“ Ogbe” - meaning “clan” or “family”

So when combined, Omodiagbe is a Surname that reflects the importance of children in societies and families. It translates literally to “A child straightens the clan” which means “a child is the backbone of a clan”. 
 Notable people with the surname include:

Darlington Omodiagbe (born 1978), Nigerian footballer
Emmanuel Omodiagbe (born 1985), Nigerian footballer
 

Surnames of Nigerian origin